Gary Fletcher, (September 15, 1940 – April 30, 1988) was an American professional wrestler who was best known by his ring name, Man Mountain Mike.

Career
Fletcher was discovered by Al Lovelock, who wrestled as The Great Bolo. Lovelock trained Fletcher as a wrestler, and Fletcher made his wrestling debut in 1967 for American Wrestling Association.

He wrestled as a tag team with Haystacks Calhoun, who also weighed over 600 pounds. Their combined weight was over 1200 pounds in the ring.

Mike was wrestling with "Iron" Mike DiBiase on July 2, 1969 in Lubbock, Texas, when DiBiase suffered a fatal heart attack in the ring during the match. DiBiase was pronounced dead at the hospital. DiBiase's death was not related to professional wrestling; he died as a result of high cholesterol.

Mike later wrestled in British Columbia, where he had a series of matches against Don Leo Jonathan in 1970 and 1971. Mike wrestled for Championship Wrestling from Florida in the early 1970s. He participated in many battles royal and, because of his size, was difficult for opponents to throw over the top rope and eliminate. As a result, the promotion billed him as "the acknowledged king of battles royal" and promoted many of these matches as "featuring Man Mountain Mike". On one occasion in 1972, his participation led to a feud with Buddy Colt, as Colt caused Mike to be eliminated from a battle royal.

While competing for NWA Hollywood Wrestling, Mike won the NWA Americas Tag Team Championship with tag team partner Butcher Brannigan on August 31, 1974 at the Olympic Auditorium in Los Angeles, California. At that time, Brannigan was feuding with Porkchop Cash, Cash teamed up with Victor Rivera to face the champions, who dropped the title belts to the challengers.

Man Mountain Mike toured Japan as a wrestler in 1975. He had a series of matches against Antonio Inoki. Mike was unable to defeat Inoki in singles matches or in tag team competitions. He later wrestled for the World Wide Wrestling Federation. He competed in both singles and tag team matches, which included teaming with Crusher Blackwell on February 20, 1976 in a loss to WWWF Tag Team Champions Louis Cerdan and Tony Parisi.

Retirement and death
After retiring from the ring in 1977, Mike opened Man Mountain Mike's Drycleaners, as well as a taxi service; he also drove a school bus.

While working as a bus driver in 1988, because he was a large man, he had to put his seat all the way back, but that day, he banged the back of his leg on the seat track and his leg was cut open. Along with diabetes stemming from his size, he developed a staph infection in the cut on his leg, causing blood clots, which killed him on April 30 at the age of 47.

The ring name Man Mountain Mike was later used in the Canadian Maritimes by Mike Shaw, who also competed for the World Wrestling Federation and World Championship Wrestling as Bastion Booger and Norman the Lunatic, respectively.

Championships and accomplishments
NWA Hollywood Wrestling
NWA Americas Tag Team Championship (1 Time) - with Butcher Brannigan
NWA "Beat the Champ" Television Championship (2 Times)

See also
 List of premature professional wrestling deaths

References

External links 
 Profile at Online World of Wrestling

American male professional wrestlers
1940 births
1988 deaths
20th-century American male actors
20th-century professional wrestlers
NWA "Beat the Champ" Television Champions
NWA Americas Tag Team Champions